Allen Drury's University series is a trio of novels written by political novelist Allen Drury between 1990 and 1998, which follow a group of university fraternity brothers for a span of over 60 years from 1938 to 2001. Drury graduated from Stanford University in 1939, and his experiences there provided the basis for the series. The novels are set in a different fictional timeline from Drury's 1959 novel Advise and Consent, which earned him a Pulitzer Prize for Fiction.

Toward What Bright Glory? (1990) introduces Richard "Willie" Wilson and his diverse Alpha Zeta fraternity brothers, who are beginning their senior year at "the University" as war in Europe looms on the horizon. Into What Far Harbor? (1993) finds the remaining Alpha Zetas returning from World War II and facing a new set of challenges in a changed world. Finally in Public Men (1998), octogenarian Willie plans a 2001 reunion for his surviving pals as he looks back on his run for the Presidency decades earlier.

Drury completed Public Men two weeks before his death in 1998, and the novel was published posthumously.

Toward What Bright Glory? (1990)

Toward What Bright Glory? is the first novel in Allen Drury's University series, published in 1990. It introduces Willie Wilson and his diverse Alpha Zeta fraternity brothers, who are beginning their senior year at "the University," unnamed, but matching the description of his alma mater, Stanford, as war in Europe looms on the horizon. Kirkus Reviews gave this overview:

Plot summary
In 1938, student body president Willie Wilson begins his senior year at "the University" with the threat of war in Europe looming. He and his diverse Alpha Zeta fraternity brothers find themselves facing off in a microcosm of the changing world around them.  Wilson tries to sponsor the fraternity's first Black member, only to be thwarted by the blatantly racist scion of a South Carolina family.  The Black student blames Wilson for building his hopes up.  Also, another member is hopelessly in love with Wilson's younger brother.

Critical reception
Library Journal complimented the novel as "bustling" and "old-fashioned", conceding that "the large cast is initially confusing, and some awkward writing doesn't help, but the storytelling soon gathers momentum, engrossing the reader in the fate of the numerous characters." Publishers Weekly wrote:

Kirkus Reviews called the many characters "tokens and stereotypes all", noting that "sweet scenes of halcyon days and noble youth coming-of-age are mixed with heavy dollops of melodrama, and the result is pure treacle" and calling the novel "painfully slow, woefully anachronistic — though a real gem for Stanford boosters and alums."

Into What Far Harbor? (1993)

Into What Far Harbor? is the second novel in Allen Drury's University series, published in 1993. It rejoins the remaining Alpha Zetas after World War II,  and has been called a "portrait of a generation struggling to find its way."

Promotional copy for the novel read:

Plot summary
Returning from the war, Willie Wilson and the remaining fraternity brothers of Alpha Zeta face a post-war world with new challenges, including marital and family woes, complicated sexuality, the Cold War and the Vietnam War.

Public Men (1998)

Public Men is the third and final novel in Allen Drury's University series, published in 1998. A 2001 reunion of the surviving Alpha Zeta fraternity brothers frames Willie Wilson's flashbacks to the decades since the events of Into What Far Harbor?.

Drury completed Public Men two weeks before his death in 1998, and the novel was published posthumously.

Plot summary
Octogenarian Willie Wilson plans a 2001 reunion for his surviving pals as he looks back on the previous few decades of his life, including his run for the Presidency in the 1980s. Crossing him at every turn in these turbulent times is the villainous René Suratt.

Critical reception
Publishers Weekly called Drury's final novel "one last hyperbolic salvo at those he deems culpable for America's plummeting moral, cultural and political values" and suggested that "the story crumbles beneath the weight of its own world-weariness and despair for a nation that no longer measures up to the author's ideals." The review also noted:

Erik Tarloff wrote in The New York Times, "the real problem with Public Men is less its political content than its inability to hit its chosen targets." He added, "this is a book that, fittingly enough, matches its valedictory status with a valedictory tone and atmosphere. But it isn't likely to satisfy readers who aren't already devotees of Mr. Drury's work." Mary Carroll of Booklist said of the book, "There's nothing subtle about the politics here, but readers who enjoyed Drury's earlier University novels will want to peruse the final leg of these public men's journey to that great frat house in the sky." Barbara Conaty wrote for Library Journal:

Kirkus Reviews called the novel "a middlebrow time-passer for the Drury faithful" and noted, "Drury's a high-spirited and dreadful stylist. Still, there's some fun in his romping run-on sentences and larger-than-life cardboard figures, mouthing off paralyzing nullities as they batter straw horses." The Amazon.com review stated, "Political junkies will appreciate the twists and turns of this Washington insider novel. Readers who require a modicum of literary polish, however, will be disappointed. Drury's talents lie in plotting his intricate tales; his writing is merely serviceable."

References

American LGBT novels
American political novels
Family saga novels
Novel series
University Series
Novels with gay themes